Anna Banerji M.D., O. Ont. is an academic, a Toronto infectious disease doctor and the president of the Society of Refugee Healthcare Providers.

Education 
Banerji studied Arts and Science at the University of Toronto from 1983 to 1985. In 1989, she graduated from the University of Toronto as a Doctor of Medicine.

She obtained a Masters of Public Health, from Harvard School of Public Health, in 2003.

Academic career 
From 2007 to 2016, Banerji was an assistant professor at University of Toronto's Faculty of Medicine specialising in primary healthcare and pediatrics.

She is currently an associate professor at both the University of Toronto's Dalla Lana School of Public Health, and the University of Toronto's Faculty of Medicine.

In 2009, Banerji published a paper that showed that infants in Nunavut have the highest global rate of Respiratory syncytial virus.

Banerji is the co-founder and president of the Society of Refugee Healthcare Providers.

Advocacy 
Throughout the COVID-19 pandemic she was regularly quoted in Canadian media speaking about the connections between COVID-19 and child mental health, about how to safely navigate family gatherings, the importance of COVID-19 vaccines, COVID-19 vaccine mandates, and for better public policy.

Awards 

 Order of Ontario, 2012
 Diamond Jubilee Medal, 2012

Family 
Anna Banerji had a son, Nathan Banerji-Kearney, who died in 2018 by suicide aged 14.

References

External links 
 Society of Refugee Healthcare Providers, official website

Living people
University of Toronto alumni
Harvard School of Public Health alumni
Officers of the Order of Canada
Canadian public health doctors
Women public health doctors
Founders
Year of birth missing (living people)
Place of birth missing (living people)